Far Away and Long Ago is a 1978 Argentine film based on the memoir of the same title by William Henry Hudson.

External links
 

1978 films
Argentine drama films
1970s Spanish-language films
1970s Argentine films